Nora Decter is an instructor at the University of Winnipeg and an award-winning author.  She  won the 2019 Kobo Emerging Writer Prize for fiction for her novel How Far We Go and How Fast.  The Kobo Prize comes with a $10,000 cash award.

Her bachelor's degree, from York University, is in English and Creative Writing.  She has an MFA in Creative Writing and Literature from Stony Brook University.

References 

Academic staff of University of Winnipeg
21st-century Canadian novelists
21st-century Canadian women writers
Canadian women novelists
Living people
Year of birth missing (living people)